Walter is an unincorporated community in Cullman County, Alabama, United States.

History
Walter is named for the son of the community's first postmaster. A post office operated under the name Walter from 1888 to 1905.

References

Unincorporated communities in Cullman County, Alabama
Unincorporated communities in Alabama